Jón Ólafsson (–1679) was an Icelandic traveller noted for his autobiography which covers his travels in Europe and later to the Danish settlement of Tranquebar (Tharangambadi) in India.

Works
 English translations

References

1679 deaths
Jón Ólafsson
Tranquebar
Explorers of India
Year of birth uncertain